Trial Through Fire is the second album by City of Fire, the side project of Fear Factory vocalist Burton C. Bell alongside bassist Byron Stroud (Zimmers Hole, ex-3 Inches of Blood, ex-Fear Factory, ex-Strapping Young Lad), drummer Bob Wagner and guitarist/producer Terry "Sho" Murray. The CD was recorded at The Factory studios in Vancouver, Canada.

Musical style

The musical style consists of various rock genre fusions, fusing groove metal, experimental music, alternative rock, ambient music, and at times, extreme metal.

Track listing

Music video

City of Fire posted the video of the song "Bad Motivator" which was included on the album "Trial Through Fire". The video was filmed in Toronto, Canada, under the direction of Cody Calahan.

Bell said:

Personnel

Burton C. Bell - vocals
Byron Stroud - bass
Bob Wagner - drums
Sho Murray - guitars

References

2013 albums
City of Fire (band) albums